The discography of The Decemberists, the indie/folk rock band from Portland, Oregon, United States.

Albums

Studio albums

Live albums

Collaborative albums

EPs

Singles

Other charting songs

Compilation appearances

DVD

Notes

References

Discographies of American artists
Rock music group discographies